Clifton Hurburgh (15 January 1917 – 30 July 2011) was an Australian cricketer. He played one first-class match for Tasmania in 1951/52.

See also
 List of Tasmanian representative cricketers

References

External links
 

1917 births
2011 deaths
Australian cricketers
Tasmania cricketers
Cricketers from Hobart